Traditional counties are counties which may be no longer used for administrative purposes and refers to:
 Ancient counties of England
 Counties of Scotland
 Historic counties of Wales
 Counties in New Zealand
 List of Quebec counties